The FOW International Heavyweight Championship was a professional wrestling title in American independent promotion Future of Wrestling. The title was created when Cyborg won the title in Lima, Peru on April 24, 1999. It was defended throughout southern Florida, most often in Davie, Plantation, Pembroke Pines and occasionally in Ft. Lauderdale and Tampa, Florida. During the first half of 1999, the title was also defended in Lima and during later international tours to Peru and Saudi Arabia. There have been a total of 13 recognized individual champions, who have had a combined 15 official reigns.

Title history

Combined reigns

References

External links
FOW Official Title History
FOW International Championship

Heavyweight wrestling championships